Charles Gillibert (born 14 September 1977) is a French film producer.

Life and career
Gillibert was born in Tassin-la-Demi-Lune. His parents were Michel Gillibert and Françoise Barquin; he is the brother of the actress Violaine Gillibert and Emmanuel Gillibert, the head of Eggs publicity agency.

In 1995 Gillibert and Nathanaël Karmitz founded the film production company NADA as well as the Kieslowski Award, producing around a hundred short films, art videos and documentaries, many of which were awarded in most of international film festivals.

In 2002, NADA merged with the MK2 group and Charles Gillibert launched MK2 Music, a label in the heart of the connection between music and moving images, facing new creative formats, giving rise to the first cinemix performances. MK2 Music has also produced modern dance performance films with artists such as William Forsythe directed by Thierry de Mey (One Flat Thing Reproduced), Merce Cunningham directed by Charles Atlas (Biped/Pondway) and Angelin Preljocaj by Olivier Assayas (Sonntags Abschied).

Beginning from 2006, Gillibert produced feature films for MK2 on an international scale, he produced more than fifteen feature films until 2013 within MK2 with authors/directors such as Gus Van Sant, Abbas Kiarostami, Walter Salles, Xavier Dolan, Olivier Assayas and Abdellatif Kechiche. Between 2010 and 2013 Charles Gillibert was a member of the MK2 management board .  In January 2013, he created CG CINEMA, his own film production company internationally oriented and focused on directors development.

In 2013, Gillibert collaborated in the creation of the investment company Cinémaphore with Julie Gayet and François Pinault before being called by Centre National de la Cinématographie to sit at the Commission for reflection on the new French film financing models.

In 2014, CG CINEMA introduced its first production Clouds of Sils Maria by Olivier Assayas selected at the Cannes Film festival, then Eden by Mia Hansen-Løve selected at the Toronto International Film Festival and the company co-produced  Desierto by Jonás Cuarón with Alfonso Cuarón.

Selected filmography  
Paranoid Park by  Gus Van Sant (2007) - Official selection at the Cannes Festival in 2007: 60th Anniversary Award
Summer Hours by Olivier Assayas (2007) -  American Critic's Award for Best Foreign Film
Vénus noire d‘Abdellatif Kechiche (2010) -  Official selection at the Venice Film Festival 2010
Certified Copy by Abbas Kiarostami (2010) - Official selection at the Cannes Festival in 2010: Best Actress Award for Juliette Binoche.
Stretch by Charles de Meaux (2011)
The Fairy by Dominique Abel, Fiona Gordon and Bruno Romy (2011) - Opening film at Quinzaine des Réalisateurs, Cannes Film Festival 2011
On the Road  by Walter Salles (2012) - Official selection at the Cannes Film Festival in 2012
Like Someone in Love by Abbas Kiarostami (2012) - Official selection at the Cannes Film Festival in 2012
Laurence Anyways by Xavier Dolan (2012) - Official selection at the Cannes Film Festival in 2012, Un Certain Regard section (Best Actress Award for Suzanne Clément) -  Cabourg Film Festival 2012 (Grand Prize and Youth Prize)
Something in the Air by Olivier Assayas (2012) - Official selection at the 2012 Venice Film Festival (Screenplay Prize)
Clouds of Sils Maria by Olivier Assayas (2014) - Official selection at the 2014 Cannes Film Festival
Mustang by Deniz Gamze Ergüven (2015) - Nominated for Best Foreign Language Film at the 88th Academy Awards.
Things to Come by Mia Hansen-Løve (2016)
Rosalie Blum by Julien Rappeneau (2016)
Personal Shopper by Olivier Assayas (2016) - Official selection at the Cannes Film Festival in 2016
Lost in Paris by Dominique Abel and Fiona Gordon (2016)
Kings (2017) by Deniz Gamze Ergüven
24 Frames (2017) by Abbas Kiarostami
Long Day's Journey Into Night by Bi Gan
Knife + Heart by Yann Gonzalez (2018)
Non-Fiction by Olivier Assayas (2018)
Bergman Island by Mia Hansen-Løve (2020)
My Best Part (Garçon chiffon) by Nicolas Maury (2020)

References

External links 
 
 
 Charles Gillibert @ Cineuropa

1977 births
Living people
French film producers
People from Tassin-la-Demi-Lune